Vexillum cadaverosum is a species of small sea snail, marine gastropod mollusk in the family Costellariidae, the ribbed miters.

Description
The length of the shell varies between 13 mm and 22 mm.

The shell is whitish, with a narrow chestnut or chocolate band, either continuous or interrupted by the ribs.

The shell is more stumpy, usually smaller, less disposed to granulation than Vexillum exasperatum (Gmelin, 1791), and its single band, when not continuous, appears in the interstices of the ribs, unlike the
interrupted bands of V. exasperatum, which appear on the backs of the ribs.

Distribution
This marine species occurs off the Philippines and Lord Hood Islands; Red Sea; tropical Indo-Pacific to Polynesia, New Caledonia and Hawaii; off Papua New Guinea and Australia (Northern Territory, Queensland, Western Australia)

References

 Issel, A. 1869. Malacologia del Mar Rosso. Richerche zoologische e paleontologiche. Pisa : Biblioteca malacologica pp. 1-388, pls 1-5. 
 Dautzenberg, P. & Bouge, L.J. 1923. Mitridés de la Nouvelle-Calédonie et de ses dépendances. Journal de Conchyliologie 67(2): 179-25
 Wilson, B. 1994. Australian marine shells. Prosobranch gastropods. Kallaroo, WA : Odyssey Publishing Vol. 2 370 pp.
 Arnaud, J.P., Berthault, C., Jeanpierre, R., Martin, J.C. & Martin, P. 2002. Costellariidae et Mitridae de Nouvelle Calédonie. Xenophora. Association française de conchyliologie. Supplément 100: 52 pp
 Cernohorsky, W.O. 1970. Systematics of the families Mitridae & Volutomitridae (Mollusca: Gastropoda). Bulletin of the Auckland Institute and Museum. Auckland, New Zealand 8: 1-190
 Hinton, A. 1972. Shells of New Guinea and the central Indo-Pacific. Milton : Jacaranda Press xviii 94 pp. 
 Maes, V.O. 1967. The littoral marine mollusks of Cocos-Keeling Islands (Indian Ocean). Proceedings of the Academy of Natural Sciences, Philadelphia 119: 93–217
 Salvat, B. & Rives, C. 1975. Coquillages de Polynésie. Tahiti : Papéete Les editions du pacifique, 391 pp.
 Taylor, J.D. 1986. Diets of sand living predatory gastropods at Piti Bay, Guam. Asian Marine Biology 3: 47-58 
 Wils, E. & Verbinnen, G. 2002. Red Sea Mollusca: Part 12. Class Gastropoda; Family: Costellariidae. Gloria Maris 41(1-2): 29-37

External links
 Reeve, L. A. (1844-1845). Monograph of the genus Mitra. In: Conchologia Iconica, or, illustrations of the shells of molluscous animals, vol. 2, pl. 1-39 and unpaginated text. L. Reeve & Co., London.
  Liénard, Élizé. Catalogue de la faune malacologique de l'île Maurice et de ses dépendances comprenant les îles Seychelles, le groupe de Chagos composé de Diego-Garcia, Six-îles, Pèros-Banhos, Salomon, etc., l'île Rodrigues, l'île de Cargados ou Saint-Brandon. J. Tremblay, 1877.
  Cernohorsky, Walter Oliver. The Mitridae of Fiji; The veliger vol. 8 (1965)

cadaverosum
Gastropods described in 1844